Kostyantyn Kravchenko (born 24 September 1986) is a retired Ukrainian footballer.

Usually an offensive midfielder, Kravchenko is best known for his passing, technique and finishing ability. His brother Anton Kravchenko is also a football player.

Career
Kravchenko previously appeared for FC Dnipro Dnipropetrovsk from 2004 before signing for Shakhtar on 10 January 2008 for a fee of $5.5 million. He scored his first goal for Shakhtar Donetsk on 30 March 2008 in a 4–2 win over Arsenal Kyiv. Following his move to Shakhtar they won the Ukrainian Premier League but fell one appearance short of obtaining a winner's medal.

From July 2011 he is on one-year loan in Karpaty Lviv.

In July 2012, Kravchenko signed a three-year contract with Illichivets Mariupol.

In July 2014 Kravchenko joined the Latvian Higher League club FK Spartaks Jūrmala, signing a contract till the end of the season.

Honours
2008 Ukrainian Premier League, with Shakhtar Donetsk

References

External links
 
 

1986 births
Living people
Footballers from Dnipro
Ukrainian footballers
Ukrainian Premier League players
Ukrainian First League players
Ukrainian Second League players
FC Dnipro players
FC Dnipro-2 Dnipropetrovsk players
FC Dnipro-3 Dnipropetrovsk players
FC Shakhtar Donetsk players
FC Mariupol players
FC Karpaty Lviv players
Ukrainian expatriate footballers
FK Spartaks Jūrmala players
Expatriate footballers in Latvia
Ukrainian expatriate sportspeople in Latvia
FC Desna Chernihiv players
FC Stal Kamianske players
Association football midfielders